The following is a list of cult music artists organized alphabetically:

A 
Adam Green
Alec Empire
Alex Chilton
Alice Coltrane
Amanda Palmer
Amy Winehouse
Animal Collective
Aphex Twin
Arcade Fire
Arctic Monkeys
Ariel Pink
Arthur Lee
Arthur Russell

B 
Badfinger
The Beatles
Beastie Boys
Beck
Belle and Sebastian
Ben Folds
Ben Folds Five
Betty Davis
Big L
Bill Drummond
Bis
Billy Childish
Björk
Black Sabbath
Blondie
Blur
Bobbie Gentry
Bon Iver
Sérgio Mendes & Brasil '66
Brian Eno
Brigitte Fontaine
Buzzcocks

C 
Captain Beefheart
Cardiacs
Carly Rae Jepsen
Cate Le Bon
The Chemical Brothers
Chic
The Clash
Cocteau Twins
Courtney Barnett
The Cure

D 
Daft Punk
Daniel Johnston
Daniel Miller
David Bowie
De La Soul
Delia Derbyshire
Depeche Mode
Devo
Dillinger Four
Dinosaur Jr.
Dizzie Rascal
DJ Shadow
Donny Hathaway

E 
Edith Piaf
Elbow
Elvis Costello
Emitt Rhodes

F 
Fad Gadget
The Fall
Father John Misty
Fela Kuti
FKA Twigs
The Flaming Lips
Fleet Foxes
Frank Zappa
Franz Ferdinand
Fugazi

G 
Gentle Giant
Gil Scott-Heron
Glassjaw
Godspeed You! Black Emperor
Goldfrapp
Gospel
Gram Parsons
Guided by Voices

H 
Hawkwind
Hot Chip

I 
Ian Svenonius
Iggy Pop

J 
Janis Joplin
J Dilla
Jacqueline du Pré
Janelle Monáe
Jeff Buckley
Jessie Mae Hemphill
The Jesus and Mary Chain
Jim Morrison
Joanna Newsom
John Cage
John Foxx
John Grant
Joni Mitchell
Joy Division

K 
Karen Dalton
Karlheinz Stockhausen
Kat Bjelland
Kate Bush
Kendrick Lamar
King Gizzard & the Lizard Wizard
Kool Keith
Kraftwerk

L 

Laurie Anderson
LCD Soundsystem
Lee "Scratch" Perry
Lili Boulanger
Lionrock
Little Simz
Lucius
Lydia Lunch

M 
Madonna
The Magnetic Fields
Manu Chao
Marianne Faithfull
Mark E. Smith
Mark Hollis
Mark Linkous
Mary Margaret O'Hara
Massive Attack
Mike Patton
Moondog
Moxy Früvous
Os Mutantes

N 
Neil Young
Neutral Milk Hotel
New Order
Nick Cave and the Bad Seeds
Nick Drake
Nico
Nirvana

O 
Oasis
Oingo Boingo
Operation Ivy (band)
Outkast

P 
Parliament-Funkadelic
Patti Smith
Pavement
Peaches
Pearl Jam
Peter Hammill
Phish
Pixies
PJ Harvey
The Pogues
Prefab Sprout
Primal Scream
Prince
Public Enemy
Pulp

Q 
Queens of the Stone Age

R 
The Rolling Stones
R. Stevie Moore
Radiohead
Ramones
Reel Big Fish
The Replacements
R.E.M.
Richard H. Kirk
Richard Hell
Robert Johnson
Robert Wyatt
Roky Erickson
Roxy Music
Run-DMC
Rush<ref 
The Rutles
Ryuichi Sakamoto

S 
Sandy Denny
Scott Walker
Scritti Politti
Serge Gainsbourg
Sex Pistols
Sibylle Baier
Sixto Rodriguez
The Slits
The Smiths
Sonic Youth
Soul Coughing
Sly & The Family Stone
Sparks
The Specials
Spinal Tap
St. Vincent
Stereolab
The Stone Roses
The Stooges
The Strokes
Sufjan Stevens
Sun Ra
Super Furry Animals
Syd Barrett

T 
Talking Heads
Tame Impala
Television Personalities
They Might Be Giants
Tiny Tim
Todd Rundgren
Tom Waits
TV On the Radio

V 
Van Halen
The Velvet Underground
Violent Femmes

W 
Weezer
White Denim
The White Stripes
Whitehouse
Wilco
Wiley
Wire
Wu-Tang Clan

X 
XTC
The xx

Y 
Yes
Yoko Ono
The Yummy Fur

References 

Music fandom
Cult following
Lists of musicians